Jana Farmanová (born 1970) is a Slovak contemporary figurative painter who has been called one of the most influential painters of contemporary Slovak and Czech art scene.

Farmanová has been active in the visual arts since the late 1990s, after studying at Academy of Fine Arts and Design in Bratislava, Slovakia.

Her work has been displayed at the Bratislava City Gallery in Bratislava, Nitra Gallery in Nitra, Slovakia, Wannieck Gallery of Modern Art in Brno, Czech Republic, Olomouc Museum of Art in Olomouc, Czech Republic, and the Sammlung Würth collection in Germany. In 2012 Slovart publishing house and Krokus Gallery published the monograph of Farmanová's artwork, with text by Czech art-historian Petr Vaňous, author Eva Borušovičová and poet Mila Haugová.

Solo exhibitions
 2018-2019 Jana Farmanová – What Remains?, Alšova Jihočeská galerie, Castle Riding School, Hluboká nad Vltavou, Czech Republic 
 2018 Jana Farmanová (with Petra Ondreičková Nováková)| Here Means Now, Embassy of Slovak Republic in Washington, USA 
 2018 Jana Farmanová - We Are Family, Galerie Vyšehrad, Prague, Czech Republic 
 2018 Jana Farmanová - In My Gardens, Banská Bystrica, Slovak Republic
 2016 Jana Farmanová – Essences, Galéria Jozefa Kollára, Banská Štiavnica, Slovak Republic
 2016 Jana Farmanová - I Plant Seeds of Sun-flower and Looking for Sun Over Clouds At Home Gallery, Šamorín, Slovakia
 2015 Jana Farmanová. SO Vulnerable, So Strong. With guest: Pavlína Fichta Čierna, Krokus Galeria, Bratislava, Slovak Republic
 2015 Jana Farmanová – Under the Sign of Virgo, Bratislava City Gallery, Bratislava, Slovak Republic
 2014 Attention Fragile, Gallery Kubik, Porto, Portugal
 2013 Jana Farmanová, (with Juliana Mrvová), Herbarium of the Time, Industrial Gallery, Ostrava, Czech Republic
 2013 Something Substantial, Sypka Gallery, Valašské Meziříčí, Czech Republic
 2012 Conversion, Krokus Gallery, Bratislava, Slovak Republic
 2012 Self-Confidence, The East Slovak Gallery, Košice, Slovak Republic
 2012 Weightlessness, Vernon Gallery, Prague, Czech Republic
 2011 On the Rail, Stanica, Žilina-Zárečie, Slovak Republic
 2011 Welcome to Yourself, Kubik Gallery, Porto, Portugal
 2010 Focus, City Gallery, Rimavská Sobota, Slovak Republic
 2009 Histoire. Life with(out) a Good Communist, Krokus Gallery, Bratislava, Slovak Republic
 2009 Soundtrack, Vernon Gallery, Prague, Czech Republic
 2009 Dolls, The Old Theatre, Nitra, Slovak Republic
 2008 Cooking Jam, Bastart Contemporary, Bratislava, Slovak Republic
 2008 Elements and Miracles, Slovak Institute, Rome, Italy
 2008 Ici e mantenant, Slovak Institut, Paris, France
 2008 Jana Farmanová (with Martin Piaček): Melancholia, Fiducia Gallery, Ostrava, Czech Republic
 2008 Not Only Media Faces, Linea Gallery, Bratislava, Slovak Republic
 2006 Jana Farmanová, Nitra Gallery, Slovak Republic
 2006 Women's Toys, Bonjour, Bratislava, Slovak Republic
 2005 Women's Toys, Ad Astra Gallery, Brno, Czech Republic
 2005 Ofélia & Diana, At Home Gallery, Šamorín, 2006, Slovak Republic
 2004 Barefoot, Sla-Sla Gallery, Munich, Germany
 2004 Barefoot, CC-Centrum, Bratislava, Slovak Republic
 2004 Aut Bene Aut Nihil, Slovak Institute, Budapest, Hungary
 2003 JF, Youth Gallery in Nitra Gallery, Nitra, Slovak Republic
 2003 The Colour Run Out, Orava Gallery, Dolný Kubín, Slovak Republic
 2003 Privacy, Gallery Subterra, Nitra, Slovak Republic
 1995 Entrance, City Gallery, Nitra, Slovak Republic

Group exhibitions
 2018-2019 Plus Minus - Contemporary Slovak Art from the Collection of Bratislava City Gallery, Oblastní galerie Liberec, Czech Republic 
 2018 Total Romantic. Contemporary Imagery in the World of Women Painters, Jan Koniarek Gallery in Trnava, Trnava, Slovak Republic
 2018 More Than 30 ..., Zoya Museum, Modra, Republic
 2017 The Joy of Blood Bond, (Jana Farmanová, Monika Kubinská & Erna Masarovičová) Medium Gallery, Bratislava, Slovak Republic
 2014 The Boundaries of Children's Soul, Turiec Gallery, Martin, Slovak Republic
 2013 Film. Directed by Artist 2., Nitra Gallery, Slovak Republic
 2013 La Petite Piece de Barbe Bleue, Musée L'Atelier Gaston de Luppé, Arles, France
 2013 Berührend, Kro Art Contemporary, Vienna, Austria
 2012 Where is the way out?, Nitra Gallery, Nitra, Slovak Republic
 2011 Love in Time of Youth, Love in Time of Crisis, The East Slovak Gallery, Košice, Slovak Republic
 2011 ObraSKov, Wannieck Gallery, Brno, Czech Republic
 2011 Miracles – Wunderkammer, Kro Art Gallery, Vienna, Austria
 2010 Inter-view, Nitra Gallery, Nitra, Slovak Republic
 2010 Painting Studio – Koceľová 23 Street, The House of Art, Bratislava, Slovak Republic
 2009 8 Women, Slovak Union of Visual Arts, Bratislava, Slovak Republic
 2009 Contact, City Hall Gallery, Oslo, Norway
 2009 Tolerance in Art, Danubiana Meulensteen Art Museum, Bratislava, Slovak Republic
 2009 3rd Chapter of Slovak Contemporary Art, The Gallery of Art Critics, Prague, Czech Republic
 2008 Body and Oil, The House of Art, Bratislava, Slovak Republic
 2008 The New Zlin Salon, Zlín, Czech Republic
 2008 The Big Wash, Galerie Caesar, Olomouc, Czech Republic
 2008 MB,MN,JF,RP,JK,TD, Slovak Institute, Prague, Czech Republic
 2008 Introcity, The Topič Salon Association Gallery, Prague, Czech Republic
 2007 Slovak Contemporary Art, Cobalt International Gallery, Brussels, Belgium
 2007 Mirror as a Tool of Illusion, Nitra Gallery, Nitra, Slovak Republic
 2007 Painting Biennal, City Gallery, Rimavská Sobota, Slovak Republic
 2007 Resseting, Prague City Gallery, Prague, Czech Republic
 2006 Draught, The Central Slovakian Gallery, Banská Bystrica, Slovak Republic
 2006 Draught, National Gallery in Prague, Praha, Czech Republic
 2006 The calm, Nitra Gallery, Nitra, Slovak Republic
 2005 Draught, Museum of Art Žilina, Žilina, Slovak Republic
 2004 This Is My Place, Synagogue – Contemporary Art Centre/Jan Koniarek Gallery, Trnava, Slovak Gallery
 2003 This Is My Place, State Gallery, Banská Bystrica, Slovak Gallery
 2002 Madona v slovenskom výtvarnom umení | Madona In the Slovak Art, Nitra Gallery, Nitra, Slovak Gallery
 2001 Pars pro toto, Exhibition Space of Town Hall, České Budějovice, Czech Republic
 2000 Body, DIVYD Gallery, Bratislava, Slovak Republic
 2000 Space, Gallery BRIK, Praha, Slovak Gallery
 1997 Ecce Hommo, Nitra Gallery, Nitra, Slovak Republic
 1994 Slovak Contemporary Art, The Czech Centre, Berlin, Germany
 1994 Young art, Slovak Embassy, London, UK / GB
 1994 Drawings, Tennessee, USA

Fiction's and Poetry Book Illustration
 Denisa Fulmeková: Materská (Maternity Leave), vyd. Ikar, Bratislava, 2012
 Denisa Fulmeková: Topánky z papiera (Shoes of Paper), Ikar, Bratislava, 2009
 Carol Ann Duffy: Nesvätá žena. Výber z poézie (UnSaint Woman- Poetry Selection), Literárna nadácia STUDŇA, 2006.

Bibliography
 Moncoľová I.: The Joy of Blood Bond, Vydavateľstvo Tympanon & Moncolova Artadvisor, Bratislava, 2017 
 Moncoľová I.: Jana Farmanová – V znamení panny, Artforum, Bratislava, 2015, 
 Majdáková D and kol.: Päťdesiat súčasných umelcov na Slovensku, Art Academy/ Slovart, Bratislava, 2014, p. 52 - 55
 Slaninová K.: Emóciami nabitá maľba Jany Farmanovej, Glosália 3/2014, n.g.o. Glosália, Bratislava, 2014, p. 1
 Kisová G., Moncoľová I. (ed.): Jana Farmanová, Krokus Galéria, Slovart, 2012, 
 Geržová B.: Gender Aspects of Contemporary Artistic Discourse, Almanac of Interdisciplinary, Slovart/ Academy of Fine Art and Design in Bratislava, Bratislava, 2012
 Vaňous P.: Kudy vede cesta ven? Farmanová, Krivošíková, Polifková, exhibition catalogue, Nitra Gallery, Nitra, 2012
 Moncoľová I.: Jana Farmanová, Váha beztíže, Galerie Vernon, Prague, 2012
 Kisová G.: Jana Farmanová: Fascinuje ma vizualizácia príbehu, rozhovor s Gabrielou Kisovou. In.: Art Banking Bulletin 3/2011
 Moncoľová I.: Situácie, príbehy a silné inšpirácie. Portrét Jany Farmanovej. In.: Profil Contemporary Art Review 2010/3, Bratislava, 2010
 Geržová B.: Histoire, Flash Art CZ/SK, October - December, Prague, 2009
 Rusinová Z.: Autoportrét v slovenskom výtvarnom umení 20. storočia, Veda, Bratislava, 2009
 Michalovič P.: Jana Farmanová. In.: Anthropos 13/2007, Bratislava, 2007
 Jablonská B.: Jana Farmanová, Nielen mediafaces, Galéria Linea, Bratislava, 2007
 Vaňous P.: Jak zformulovat vlastní skušenost?, Revue Art III/2006, Prague, 2006
 Jablonská B., Vaňous P.: Jana Farmanová, Nitrianska Galéria, Nitra, 2006

References Daily Press
 https://dennikn.sk/458674/znakova-rec-maliarky-jany-farmanovej/
 http://ujszo.com/napilap/kultura/2016/04/29/finom-erintesek 
 https://dennikn.sk/48316/v-znameni-dievcenstva/
 http://kultura.sme.sk/c/7652111/chlapcenstvo-je-v-kinach-dievcenstvo-vladne-v-galerii.html
 http://kultura.sme.sk/c/6657367/je-coraz-blizsie-k-cudzincom.html
 http://kultura.sme.sk/c/5909400/chyt-ma-za-ruku-tu-a-teraz.html
 http://kultura.sme.sk/c/5243748/jana-farmanova-malujem-si-v-hlave.html
 http://kultura.pravda.sk/galeria/clanok/59050-laska-v-case-krizy/
 http://kultura.pravda.sk/kniha/clanok/344805-vychadza-v-znameni-panny-jany-farmanovej/
 http://kultura.pravda.sk/kniha/clanok/289287-bytie-rozsirene-o-farbu-a-tvar/

References

Finom érintések In. Új Szó 29 April 2016 
Jana Farmanová: Under the Sign of Virgo (Exhibit in City Gallery Bratislava)
Jana Farmanová: Ako dospievajú dievčatá? In. Denník N, 16 th Feb. 2015

External links
WEB UMENIA
DNB Katalog der Deutschen Nationalbibliothek
Kubikgallery , Porto, Portugalsko

1970 births
Living people
Slovak painters
Slovak artists
20th-century Slovak people
21st-century Slovak people
20th-century Slovak painters
Slovak women artists
20th-century women artists